Howard Crook (born June 15, 1947) is an American lyric tenor who has lived and worked in the Netherlands and France since the early 1980s.

He was born in Rutherford, New Jersey, and educated at Baldwin-Wallace College in Berea, Ohio and then University of Illinois, where he received a master's degree in music, specialising in opera. He worked in theatre and mime for a few years before becoming a professional singer after winning second prizes in the vocal competitions of Paris and 's-Hertogenbosch.

He began to specialize in early music and has performed and recorded with the leading conductors; he has performed Leclair's Scylla et Glaucus, Berlioz's Les nuits d'été and Bach's St Matthew Passion with John Eliot Gardiner; with Trevor Pinnock, Handel's Messiah and with Roger Norrington, Henry Purcell's The Fairy-Queen.

He has sung the solos in the large-scale works of Bach and the major tenor roles in most of the operas of Lully, Rameau, Haydn and Mozart. The high-tenor roles of the French Baroque are his speciality: he has performed Charpentier's Funeral Music for Maria Theresa (H.409 & H.331) and 9 Leçons de Ténèbres; with Louis Devos; Lully's Atys with William Christie; Lully's Armide with Philippe Herreweghe; Lully's Alceste, Rameau's Castor et Pollux and Rameau's Pigmalion, amongst others, with conductors such as Marc Minkowski.

He taught baroque singing at the CNR conservatory in Paris, and regularly gave masterclasses. He is retired.

External links
Bach-cantatas.com: Howard Crook - pictures

1947 births
Living people
American operatic tenors
American performers of early music
People from Rutherford, New Jersey
Singers from New Jersey
20th-century American male opera singers
Baldwin Wallace University alumni
Classical musicians from New Jersey